Xuan Kong Flying Star feng shui or Xuan Kong Fei Xing is a discipline in Feng Shui, and is an integration of the principles of Yin Yang, the interactions between the five elements, the eight trigrams, the Lo Shu numbers, and the 24 Mountains, by using time, space and objects to create an astrological chart to analyze positive auras and negative auras of a building.

These include analyzing wealth, mental and physiological states, success, relationships with external parties, and health of the inhabitant.

During the Qing Dynasty, it was popularized by grandmaster Shen Zhu Ren, with his book Mr. Shen's Study of Xuan Kong, or Shen Shi Xuan Kong Xue.

Flying Star Feng Shui does not limit itself to buildings for the living or Yang Zhai, where rules pertaining to directions equally apply to all built structures; it also applies to grave sites and buildings for spirits or Yin Zhai.

Fundamentals

Numbers

In the Lo Shu Square, flying stars are nine numbers.

Each number in the Lo Shu represents one of the Chinese Trigrams and is related to an Element, Family Member, Cardinal, Colour, Hour, Season, Organ, Ailment and many others.

The numbers always move to the lower right (northwest), middle right (west), lower left (northeast), upper center (south), lower center (north), upper right (southwest), middle left (east), upper left (southeast) and back to the center.

Time

Time is divided into 20-Year cycles. Each cycle of 20 years is a Period or "Yun". A grand cycle comprises 9 Periods in total, which covers a span of 180 years.

Periods are used to describe the cyclical pattern of Qi. Different types of Qi have different strengths and weaknesses with the reference to a particular Period.

Periodic Table on Flying Stars

Timely and Untimely Flying Stars

A timely star is positive for a building whereas an untimely star is negative. For the current period, Period 8 (Year 2004–2023), stars Eight, Nine and One are timely (For a building, they are timely if and only if the object placed in that palace is timely). Star Eight is most timely which is often treated as Prosperous and Noble Star. Star Nine and Star One belong to Sheng Qi, a growing energy. The other six stars are regarded as having retreating, killing or dead qi.

Space

An accurate measurement of direction must be obtained before any system of Feng Shui can be undertaken.

A Luopan is a magnetic compass to determine the precise direction of a structure or an item.

24 Mountains
The most important ring on the Luopan is the 24 Mountain ring.

On the 24 Mountain ring, each direction is subdivided into three sectors.

Taking Directions

Using the principles of Yin and Yang, the facing of a building is determined by the side of the built structure that receives most Yang Qi.

A house is constructed with an architectural frontage with its side that faces whatever landscape feature. The facing of that house is considered by the direction of its frontage which is most Yang in nature.

In apartments, or condominiums, the facing of a unit is determined by the facing of the entire building. If the structure is not an obvious facade, the facing of the unit is determined by the side of the building having the most Yang energy (faces the busiest crowd flow).

Taking locations

Energy in a building can be tapped into by locating a person within a sector that houses the energy. Ideally, living objects should be located in a sector with positive Qi as determined by Flying Star Chart.

The layout of a building is demarcated with a Nine Palace grid, which looks like a tic-tac-toe grid. A door, room or other object's location refers to the square within this grid where the object is found. This may or may not correspond to the direction that the object faces. A door could be located in the southwest sector, but face south. Its location could be also southwest, and its direction to be facing to the south.

Objects

Objects are essential to evaluate the Feng Shui of a building.

Mountain

Mountain generates Qi. A lush and green mountain or hill generates auspicious Qi, while a barren, rocky rising area will, in general, generate inauspicious energy.

In urban areas, skyscrapers, apartments or any structure that rises from the ground have a similar role to a mountain: generating energy outside. From inside, cupboards, wardrobes, or any furniture that is taller or larger than any others nearby are also considered mountains.

Water

Water conducts Qi. It is essential to identify the cleanliness of the water, the location and the flow of the water formation. These include ponds, lakes, rivers, drains and fountains.

In urban areas, highways and lowlands play a similar role to waterways, conducting Qi. Inside a building or a room, a spinning fan or anything lower than ground level is considered water.

Nine-Palace Flying Stars

Nine Palace Flying Stars or Jiu Gong Fei Xing is another name of the Flying Stars method whereby palaces are the nine sectors overlaid onto a layout of the house.

Flying Star Chart

A Flying Star chart consists of three numbers in each Palace of the Luo Shu. These numbers are called the Base Star, the Facing Star and the Sitting Star.

Constructing a Flying Star Chart requires he dates that the building was occupied by the owners and the facing of the building

For example, if a building is constructed in the year 2003, but the residents do not move in until February 4 of 2004, the Period of the building is 8, not 7.

The period does not change again unless there is major renovation undertaken to the structure.

Rules and Procedures

Creating a Flying Star chart is always begun with the Base Star. The period of the building determines the number occupies the Base Star position of the Central Palace. Base Stars always fly in the Luo Shu path.

Once all the base stars are distributed amongst the nine palaces, the number in Facing Palace on the Luo Shu grid is determined by the facing direction of the building. This number is the facing star.

The Sitting Palace is always opposite of the Facing Palace. The sitting star is the number in the sitting palace.

For instance, in a Period-8 building that faces southwest, the number that locates in Facing Palace is number 5 whereas the number in Sitting Palace is number 2; thus, 5 is Facing Star and 2 is Sitting Star.

Unlike the Base Star, the Facing Star and Sitting Star can fly in either ascending (Yang) order, or descending (Yin) order. The order depends upon two factors: whether the star is an even number or an odd number, and which mountain the unit faces.

Even-numbered Stars follow a Yin-Yang-Yang form. In a certain number which comprises three mountains, if the mountain that the property faces is Yang, then the numbers fly in ascending order of Lo Shu path, and vice versa.

Odd-numbered Stars follow a Yang-Yin-Yin form. In a certain number which comprises three mountains, if the mountain that the property faces is Yang, then the numbers fly in ascending order of Lo Shu path, and vice versa.

To determine the polarity of number 5 star, go by the polarity of the Period number.

Properties of Nine Stars

Timely and Untimely
Flying stars can be timely or untimely. The nature of flying star depends on which period is to be referred and which star is being activated.

Portents and Natures

Famous Combination of Stars

Bull fight
Result of overcoming of untimely Flying Star 3 (Wood) upon Star 2 (Earth)
Relationship: Son harassing mother-in-law, a male violating a woman
Activities: Problems (Conflict, arguments, combat, lawsuit, disharmonies) for mother
Health: woman is hurt at the belly (while pregnant) or having stomachache
 Cure: introduce a red carpet or a painting that is red.  Red represents fire and will be able to change the effect that wood has on earth (control cycle) into a wood, fire and earth, supporting cycle.

Death and Disastrous

Result of combination of untimely Flying Stars 2 (Earth) and 5 (Earth)
Activities: Accidents, bankruptcy, haunted house, death 
Health: Serious sickness, cancer of the digestive system

Fire hazard
Result of fire combination of untimely Flying Stars 2 (Earth) and 7 (Metal), or of untimely Flying Stars 7 (Metal) and 9 (Fire)
Relationship: Lesbian, Male with strong female personalities
Activities: Fire, explosion

Penetrating the heart
Result of combination of untimely Flying Stars 3 (Wood) and 7 (Metal)
Relationship: Male and female fight
Activities: Cripple, armed robbery, burglary, lawsuit, scams
Health: foot disease, liver cancer, arm injury by metal

Wisdom

Result of combination of timely Flying Stars 1 (Water) and 4 (Wood), or combination of timely Flying Stars 3 (Wood) and 9 (Fire), or combination of timely Flying Stars 1 (Water) and 6 (Metal)
Activities: Intelligence, Splendid for studies and research

Metal in battle
Result of metal combination of untimely Flying Stars 6 and 7.
Relationship: combat and competition between brothers
Activities: Conflict, armed robbery, death by metal

Rich and Authority
Result of combination of timely Flying Stars 6 and 8, or timely Flying Stars 2 and 6
Activities: Success in business, especially real estate or owning land, Inheritance, Great authority

Fame and Celebration
Result of combination of timely Flying Stars 8 (Earth) and 9 (Fire)
Activities: Promotion, Marriage, Birth, Fame, Championship

Chemistry of Flying Stars

According to I-Ching, south direction belongs to fire. However, in a building, the south sector may not be a fire. The nature of a palace depends on the combination among elements of the base star, of the sitting star, of the facing star and of the Heaven Trigram.

For example, a house that faces bearing 337.6 – 352.5 was built in 2001, and was occupied by residents in 2006.

Period of the house: Period 8, since 2006 is the year of occupying

Facing: Ren mountain in North direction, bearing 337.6 – 352.5

Sitting: Bing mountain in South direction, opposite of the facing

Timely Flying Star

Timely flying star is a catalyst to the phase combination of Sitting Star, Facing Star, Base Star and Heavenly Trigram, implying whether to boost the current aura to best or to the opposite. For example, annual Star 1 (Water) has the ability to combat the competition of metallic stars 6 and 7.

Annual and Monthly Flying Stars

In Sexagenary cycle, a new Chinese year begins on start of spring, which usually falls on February 4. The annual flying star that visits the center palace has to be subtracted by one every Chinese year. Once Star 1 is reached, annual star would loop back around to 9 in next year. 

Star 1 occupies center palace in 1999, 2008, 2017 and so on.

Annual and monthly stars always follow Lo Shu path.

Daily Flying Star

Daily Flying Stars are governed by,

RULE 1: From the onset of Winter Solstice until Summer Solstice in the following year, the daily stars progress in ascending order (... 7,8,9,1, 2, 3, ...). The stars are distributed around the nine palaces following Lo Shu path.

On the very first Yang Wood Rat day or Jia-zi day after Winter Solstice, daily Star 1 presides the center palace.

RULE 2: From the onset of Summer Solstice until the next Winter Solstice, the daily stars progress in a descending order (... 3,2,1,9,8,7,...). The stars are distributed around the nine palaces fleeing Lo Shu path.

On the very first Yang Wood Rat day or Jia-zi day after Summer Solstice, daily Star 9 presides the center palace.

Bihourly Flying Star

Bi-hourly Flying Stars are ruled by,

RULE 1: From the onset of Winter Solstice until Summer Solstice in the following year, the bi-hourly stars are distributed around the nine palaces following Lo Shu path. The stars progress in ascending order every bi-hourly.

On Rat, Rabbit, Horse, and Rooster days, star 1 occupies the center sector at Rat hour (11 pm of previous day – 1 am). On Ox, Dragon, Goat, and Dog days, star 4 occupies the center sector at Rat hour. On Tiger, Snake, Monkey, Pig days, star 7 occupies the center sector at Rat hour.

RULE 2: From the onset of Summer Solstice until next Winter Solstice, the bi-hourly stars are distributed around the nine palaces fleeing Lo Shu path. The stars progress in descending order every bi-hourly.

On Rat, Rabbit, Horse, and Rooster days, star 9 occupies the center sector at Rat hour. On Ox, Dragon, Goat, and Dog days, star 6 occupies the center sector at Rat hour. On Tiger, Snake, Monkey, Pig days, star 3 occupies the center sector at Rat hour.

See also
 5 Elements (Wu Xing)
 Bagua
 Chinese calendar
 Feng shui
 Luopan
 9 Star Ki 
 Yin and yang

Notes

Further reading
 Flying Star Feng Shui free articles, professional training

I Ching
Environmental design
Chinese culture